Dorcadion lusitanicum is a species of beetle in the family Cerambycidae. It was described by Chevrolat in 1840.

Subspecies
 Dorcadion lusitanicum evorense Breuning, 1943
 Dorcadion lusitanicum lusitanicum Chevrolat, 1840

See also 
Dorcadion

References

lusitanicum
Beetles described in 1840